Heinz Wernicke (17 October 1920 – 27 December 1944) was a Luftwaffe World War II fighter ace and was credited with 117 aerial victories—that is, 117 aerial combat encounters resulting in the destruction of the enemy aircraft. He was also a recipient of the Knight's Cross of the Iron Cross, the highest award in the military and paramilitary forces of Nazi Germany during World War II. Wernicke was killed in a mid-air collision with his wingman on 27 December 1944.

Career
Wernicke was born on 17 October 1920 in Berlin of the Weimar Republic. He joined the 3. Staffel (3rd squadron) of Jagdgeschwader 54 (JG 54—54th Fighter Wing) in early 1942 as an Unteroffizier (non-commissioned officer). JG 54 at the time was stationed at the Eastern Front. In the fall of 1942, he was transferred to Ergänzungs-Jagdgruppe Ost (Supplementary Fighter Group East) and then to 6. Staffel (6th squadron) of JG 54 in early 1943. There, he claimed his first aerial victory on 7 March 1943 over an Ilyushin Il-2 ground-attack aircraft in aerial combat south of Lake Ilmen. At the time, II. Gruppe (2nd group) of JG 54 was based at Rjelbitzi, an airfield south of Leningrad. On 11 March, II. Gruppe under the command of Hauptmann (Captain) Heinrich Jung, relocated to Gatchina for combat in the Siege of Leningrad and east in the vicinity of the Volkhov River. In this combat area, Wernicke claimed a Lavochkin-Gorbunov-Gudkov LaGG-3 fighter on 19 March, a Yakovlev Yak-4 light bomber one day later, and another LaGG-3 plus a Curtiss P-40 Warhawk fighter on 27 March, taking his total to five aerial victories.

Following five further victories in June 1943, Wernicke became a fighter pilot instructor and underwent officer training courses. On 4 July 1943, Oberleutnant (First Lieutenant) Horst Ademeit, his Staffelkapitän (squadron leader) of the 6. Staffel, assessed Wernicke concluding that at the time Wernicke required further training to become an officer.

In October 1943, he was back to front line service and claimed his 88th aerial victory on 3 August 1944, and surpassed the century mark—100 aerial victories—in mid-September 1944. He was the 91st Luftwaffe pilot to achieve the century-mark. Wernicke was awarded the Knight's Cross of the Iron Cross on 30 September 1944 after 112 victories. The presentation was made by General Kurt Pflugbeil. Wernicke, now Staffelkapitän of the 1. Staffel (1st squadron) of JG 54, was killed in a midair collision with his wingman Unteroffizier Wollien on 27 December 1944.

Summary of career

Aerial victory claims
According to authors Obermaier and Spick, Wernicke claimed 117 aerial victories, all of which on the Eastern Front. Mathews and Foreman, authors of Luftwaffe Aces — Biographies and Victory Claims, researched the German Federal Archives and found records for 118 aerial victory claims, all of which claimed on the Eastern Front.

Victory claims were logged to a map-reference (PQ = Planquadrat), for example "PQ 35 Ost 18382". These sectors were then subdivided into 36 smaller units to give a location area 3 × 4 km in size.

Awards
 Iron Cross (1939) 2nd and 1st class
 German Cross in Gold on 20 March 1944 as Fahnenjunker-Feldwebel in the II./Jagdgeschwader 54
 Honour Goblet of the Luftwaffe (Ehrenpokal der Luftwaffe) on 24 April 1944 as Fahnenjunker-Oberfeldwebel and pilot
 Knight's Cross of the Iron Cross on 30 September 1944 as Leutnant and pilot in the 1./Jagdgeschwader 54

Notes

References

Citations

Bibliography

 
 
 
 
 
 
 
 
 
 
 
 

1920 births
1944 deaths
Military personnel from Berlin
People from the Province of Brandenburg
German World War II flying aces
Luftwaffe personnel killed in World War II
Recipients of the Gold German Cross
Recipients of the Knight's Cross of the Iron Cross
Aviators killed in aviation accidents or incidents
Victims of aviation accidents or incidents in 1944